"Stay with Me" is a song by German recording artist Alexander Klaws. Written and produced by Dieter Bohlen, it served as the second single from his debut studio album, Take Your Chance (2003). Released in June 2003, the uptempo pop song became Klaws's second top ten hit in Germany.

Formats and track listings

Credits and personnel
Credits taken from Take Your Chance liner notes. 

 Co-production, mixing – Jeo
 Artwork – Ronald Reinsberg 
 Choir – Billy King, Chris Bendorff, Olaf Senkbeil
 Guitar – Jörg Sander
 Lyrics, music, production – Dieter Bohlen

Charts

References

External links
  
 

2003 singles
2003 songs
Alexander Klaws songs
Songs written by Dieter Bohlen
Hansa Records singles